Tavakkolabad-e Markazi (also Romanized as Tavakkolābād-e Markazī; also known as Shahrīār-e Tavakkolī and Tavakkolābād) is a village in Doshman Ziari Rural District, Doshman Ziari District, Mamasani County, Fars Province, Iran. At the 2006 census, its population was 391, in 93 families.

References 

Populated places in Mamasani County